Cynips longiventris is a species of gall wasp in the family Cynipidae. It is found in Europe.

References

Cynipidae
Articles created by Qbugbot
Insects described in 1840